DBU may refer to:

 1,8-Diazabicyclo[5.4.0]undec-7-ene, an organic chemical, amidine base
Desh Bhagat University, Mandi Gobindgarh, Punjab, India
 Dallas Baptist University, a Christian liberal arts university in Dallas, Texas
 Dansk Boldspil-Union, the Danish Football Association
 dBu, abbreviation of decibel unit, a measurement of voltage ratio
 DBU, ISO 639-3 code for the Bondum Dogon language 
 Duluth Business University, a private university in Duluth, Minnesota

da:DBU